An imperial castle or Reichsburg was a castle built by order of the Holy Roman Emperor, whose management was entrusted to Reichsministeriales or Burgmannen. It is not possible to identify a clear distinction between imperial castles and the fortified imperial palaces or Pfalzen, because many imperial castles were used by German kings for temporary stays. Many imperial castles were built in regions such as Swabia, Franconia, the Palatinate and the Alsace, where there were a high density of imperial estates (Reichsgüter) during the Hohenstaufen era.

List of imperial castles (Reichsburgen)

France 
 Château du Haut-Kœnigsbourg, Orschwiller, Alsace

Germany

Baden-Württemberg 
 Grüningen Castle, Markgröningen
 Stettenfels Castle, Untergruppenbach

Bavaria 
 Nuremberg Castle, Nuremberg
 Harburg Castle, Harburg
 Königsberg Castle, Königsberg
 Schwedenschanze Castle, Cham
  Wildenberg Castle, Kirchzell

Hesse 
 Boyneburg, Sontra
  Friedberg Castle, Friedberg
 Gelnhausen Palace, Gelnhausen
 Hayn Castle, Dreieichenhain
 Kalsmunt Castle, Wetzlar
 Münzenberg Castle, Münzenberg

Lower Saxony 
 Harliburg, Vienenburg

North Rhine-Westphalia 
 Berenstein Castle, Bergstein

Rhineland-Palatinate 
 Berwartstein Castle, Erlenbach bei Dahn
 Cochem Castle, Cochem
  Guttenberg Castle, Oberotterbach
 Hammerstein Castle, Hammerstein
  Landeck Castle, Landau
 Landskron Castle, Bad Neuenahr-Ahrweiler
 Lindelbrunn Castle, Vorderweidenthal
 Meistersel Castle, Ramberg
 Ramburg, Ramberg
 Trifels Castle, Annweiler
 Wegelnburg, Schönau
 Wildburg, Sargenroth
  Berenstein Castle

Saarland 
 Kirkel Castle, Neuhäusel

Thuringia 
 Kyffhausen Castle, Steinthaleben

Switzerland 
 Gümmenen Castle, Gümmenen, Canton Berne
 Nydegg Castle, Berne, Canton Berne
 Weissenau Castle, Unterseen, Canton Berne

See also 
 The Imperial Castle in Poznań, Poland
 Palace
 Palas
 Kaiserpfalz (or Königspfalz)

Sources 
 Horst Wolfgang Böhme, Reinhard Friedrich, Barbara Schock-Werner (Hrsg.): Wörterbuch der Burgen, Schlösser und Festungen. Philipp Reclam, Stuttgart 2004, p. 208.

External links